Ivan Pavlovich Rebrov (1890–1938) was a politician of the Kyrgyz SSR who chaired that republic's Council of People's Commissars in an acting capacity from April 27 to July 19, 1938.

1890 births
1938 deaths
Prime Ministers of Kyrgyzstan
Communist Party of Kirghizia politicians
First convocation members of the Supreme Soviet of the Soviet Union
Second convocation members of the Supreme Soviet of the Soviet Union